The  doubles Tournament at the 2006 Banka Koper Slovenia Open took place between September 18 and September 24 on outdoor hard courts in Portorož, Slovenia.

Lucie Hradecká and Renata Voráčová won the title, after their opponents Eva Birnerová and Émilie Loit withdrew before the final (due to Loit's left wrist sprain).

Seeds

Results

Draw

References

2006 Doubles
Banka Koper Slovenia Open - Doubles